Hélio Wasum Airport  is the airport serving São Miguel do Oeste, Brazil.

History
The airport was opened in 1960.

Airlines and destinations

No scheduled flights operate at this airport.

Access

See also

List of airports in Brazil

References

External links

Airports in Santa Catarina (state)